Project Runway Canada is a Gemini Award-winning Canadian television adaptation of the American reality television series Project Runway, which debuted on the Slice network on October 8, 2007. The second season aired on Global. The series' host is fashion model Iman, while Canadian designer Brian Bailey acts as the contestants' mentor. The series was canceled after the second-season finale.

Format
Project Runway Canada uses the same format as the U.S. version of Project Runway that aired for five seasons on the Bravo network and is currently airing in the Lifetime network.

Season 1

This was the debut season of Project Runway and aired from October 8, 2007 to December 12, 2007 on the Slice network. The show won the 'Best Reality Program or Series' award at the 23rd Gemini Awards. The winner of the season was Evan Biddell who won $100,000 to start a line, a portfolio photo shoot with L'Oreal Paris and a spread with Elle Canada magazine featuring the winning model, Ashley Heart.

Season 2

Season 2 aired on Global.  The winner of the season was Sunny Fong, winning the cover and a feature spread in ELLE Canada with winning model Victoria, a professional portfolio photo shoot courtesy of L'Oréal Paris, a 'Runway to Retail' business mentorship with Winners, and $100,000 to start his own fashion line.

Judges
Iman
Brian Bailey (mentor)
Shawn Hewson
Rita Silvan

References

External links
Official website for Season 1
Official website for Season 2
AOL Canada Project Runway Canada website

 
2000s Canadian reality television series
2007 Canadian television series debuts
2009 Canadian television series endings
Slice (TV channel) original programming
Television series by Insight Productions
Global Television Network original programming
Canadian television series based on American television series
Gemini and Canadian Screen Award for Best Reality Series winners